Shane Walsh (born 1983) is an Irish sportsperson. He plays hurling with his local club Fourmilewater and Gaelic football with The Nire–Fourmilewater.  He played at inter-county level with Waterford.

Walsh scored the winning goal for Waterford in the 2003 Munster under-21 football final, against a Kerry team that included Colm Cooper and Kieran Donaghy.
Walsh won the Waterford Senior Football Championship but lost the Munster Senior Club Football Championship final with The Nire–Fourmilewater in 2006.
In October 2014, Walsh retired from inter-county hurling.

References

External links
 https://web.archive.org/web/20071117030952/http://www.waterford-news.com/news/story/?trs=cwgbauojkf

1983 births
Living people
Dual players
Waterford inter-county hurlers
Fourmilewater hurlers
The Nire Gaelic footballers
Date of birth missing (living people)